Oklahoma elections in 2020 were held on Tuesday, November 3, 2020. Its primaries were held on June 30, 2020, with runoffs taking place on August 25. Its presidential primaries were an exception to this, occurring on March 3, 2020.

In addition to the U.S. presidential race, Oklahoma voters will elect the Class II U.S. Senator from Oklahoma, 1 of 3 members of the Oklahoma Corporation Commission, all of its seats to the House of Representatives, 3 of 9 seats on the Oklahoma Supreme Court, 2 of 5 seats on the Oklahoma Court of Criminal Appeals, 3 of 12 seats on the Oklahoma Court of Civil Appeals, all of the seats of the Oklahoma House of Representatives and 25 of 48 seats in the Oklahoma State Senate. There are also two ballot measures that will be voted on, in addition to one passed in the June 30 primary.

Federal offices

President of the United States

Oklahoma has 7 electoral votes in the Electoral College. They went to Incumbent President Donald Trump.

United States Class II Senate Seat

United States House of Representatives

There are 5 U.S. Representatives in Oklahoma who will be up for election.

Corporation Commission

Polling

Results

State Judiciary
The state's two courts of last resort have 9 and 5 seats respectively. Elections are officially nonpartisan.

State Legislature
All 101 seats of the Oklahoma House of Representatives and 25 of 48 seats of the Oklahoma State Senate are up for election.

State Senate

Before the election the composition of the state senate was:

House of Representatives

Before the election the composition of the state house was:

Ballot Initiatives
2020 Oklahoma State Question 802

Polling
Question 805

Question 814

Local elections
2020 Tulsa mayoral election

Notes

References

Further reading

External links

 

 
Oklahoma